Juan Arnoldo Cayasso Reid  (born 24 June 1961) is a Costa Rican former professional footballer who played during the 1980s and 1990s.

In 2014, the film Italia 90 was shot with actor Winston Washington featuring as Cayasso.

Club career
Cayasso was born in Limón. He played for the two biggest teams in Costa Rica, starting out in Alajuelense in the early 1980s, and later switching to their arch-rivals Saprissa before the 1988 season. His transfer caused a lot of national attention because he was considered one of the most talented players in Costa Rica at the time. He made his debut for Alajuelense on 21 July 1981 against Ramonense and scored his first goal against Cartaginés on 11 April 1982. He played 225 matches for Alajuelense, scoring 62 goals. He played 104 games in total for Saprissa, scoring 27 goals.

Cayasso won several national championships, both with Saprissa and Alajuela, as well as a two CONCACAF Champions Cup titles, with Alajuelense in 1986 and with Saprissa in 1995.
During the early 1990s, Cayasso played in the Bundesliga with Stuttgarter Kickers, and later came back to Saprissa, where helped his team win several titles more. In January 1996 he moved to Turrialba after finding it hard to get playing time at Saprissa and in November 1996, Cayasso joined Goicoechea.

He scored his 100th league goal on 18 March 1998 for Carmelita but was released by them in March 2000.
He was given a testimonial match in November 2000.

International career
Nicknamed el Nene (the Kid), he made his debut for Costa Rica in 1983 and has earned a total of 49 caps, scoring 9 goals. He has represented his country in 10 FIFA World Cup qualification matches and is mostly remembered for scoring the first Costa Rican goal ever in a World Cup, against Scotland during the 1990 World Cup finals played in Italy. That game was won by the Ticos, against all predictions.

His final international was a July 1993 CONCACAF Gold Cup match against Jamaica. He also played at the 1984 Olympic Games held in Los Angeles.

International goals
Scores and results list Costa Rica's goal tally first, score column indicates score after each Cayasso goal.

Managerial career
After coaching second division side El Roble, Cayasso took the reins at Limonense in January 2005, working for free since his hometown club was heavily in debt. Later he became sports director and administrator at Limonense. From 2012 he is a member of the Sports Committee of the canton Limón.

Personal life
He is one of nine children of Arnoldo Cayasso Joseph and Muriel Reid Carr.
He married 1988 to Marta Zamora and had 2 children, Jose Cayasso and Naomi Cayasso. He later divorced, remarried, and had another son, Juan Gabriel Cayasso.

References

External links
 
 

1961 births
Living people
People from Limón Province
Association football midfielders
Costa Rican footballers
Costa Rica international footballers
1990 FIFA World Cup players
Olympic footballers of Costa Rica
Footballers at the 1984 Summer Olympics
1993 CONCACAF Gold Cup players
L.D. Alajuelense footballers
Deportivo Saprissa players
Stuttgarter Kickers players
A.D. Carmelita footballers
Belén F.C. players
Liga FPD players
Bundesliga players
2. Bundesliga players
Algerian Ligue Professionnelle 1 players
MC Oran players
Costa Rican expatriate footballers
Costa Rican expatriate sportspeople in Germany
Expatriate footballers in Germany
Costa Rican expatriate sportspeople in Algeria
Expatriate footballers in Algeria
Costa Rican football managers
Deportivo Saprissa non-playing staff
CONCACAF Championship-winning players